The Uncanny Counter is a South Korean television series starring Jo Byung-gyu, Yoo Jun-sang, Kim Se-jeong and Yeom Hye-ran. Based on the Daum webtoon Amazing Rumor by Jang Yi, it centers on the titular character So Mun, a high school student with disability who is enlisted to be part of the Counters, a group of paranormal-hunters who search for and fight against evil spirits that escape from the afterlife to prey on humans.

The first season aired on OCN from November 28, 2020 to January 24, 2021 on every Saturday and Sunday at 22.30 (KST) for 16 episodes. Each episode was released on Netflix in South Korea and internationally after their television broadcast. The series became the highest rated OCN series so far. 

The series has been renewed for a second season, which will be broadcast on tvN.

Synopsis
In the fictional city of Jungjin, a group of four demon-hunters called the Counters bear the arduous task of searching for and banishing evil spirits (akgwi) that escape from the afterlife to gain immortality. These evil spirits possess local human hosts who have committed murder or have a strong desire to murder, encourage their host's desire to kill, and consumes the spirit of the victim. The Counters were once in comas when a partner spirit from Yung, the boundary between the afterlife and the world of the living, possesses them and gives them perfectly healthy bodies and consciousness along with superhuman strength and supernatural abilities. Three of the Counters—Ga Mo-tak (Yoo Jun-sang), Do Ha-na (Kim Se-jeong) and Choo Mae-ok (Yeom Hye-ran)—pose as workers in Eonni's Noodles, a noodle restaurant which serves as their hideout.

One day, the fourth Counter Jang Cheol-joong (Sung Ji-ru) is killed in a battle against a strong "Level 3" evil spirit. As his spirit gets consumed by his killer, his Yung partner Wi-gen (Moon Sook) struggles to find a new comatose human to possess. Uncannily, she is quickly drawn towards high school boy So Mun (Jo Byung-gyu) who, despite being disabled, is nevertheless perfectly healthy and alive. As soon as Wi-gen possessed him, the unknowing Mun starts noticing bizarre changes to his body and starts seeing Wi-gen in his dreams. Soon, Mun finds the answers in Eonni's Noodles, and as he becomes the replacement to the late Cheol-joong, he finds himself in a thrilling journey of battling against bloodthirsty demons, reconnecting to his past, and uncovering the ugly truth behind a major redevelopment project in Jungjin.

Cast

Main
 Jo Byung-gyu as So Mun
 An 18-year-old high school student and the newest member of the Counters; part-time server at Eonni's Noodles. Physically disabled following a car accident that killed his parents seven years ago, he joins the Counters after being possessed by the Yung spirit Wi-gen due to his strong sense of justice, responsibility, and desire to protect those dear to him. He was frequently able to summon the Yung and was chosen in a healthy and not comatose state due to his piled-up anger and frustration that might as well destroy every evil spirit. As a Counter, he possesses superhuman speed, short-range psychometry and the ability to sense evil spirits that enter Yung's "Territory" (but in a range minor to that of Ha-na's). He later acquires psychokinesis and the ability to touch and summon the Territory at will. Mun has a strong talent in drawing and is currently illustrating a superhero webtoon alongside his best friends Woong-min and Joo-yeon.
 Yoo Jun-sang as Ga Mo-tak
 The assistant cook at Eonni's Noodles. After a near-fatal fall that caused his memory loss seven years ago, he joined the Counters after being possessed by Gi-ran, granting him superhuman strength and short-range psychometry. Mo-tak is notable for his gruff appearance but can be a joker occasionally. He was somewhat like a mentor to Mun after he got to know about his past and relationship with Mun.
 Kim Se-jeong as Do Ha-na
 The server at Eonni's Noodles. The sole survivor after she and her family were poisoned, Ha-na joined the Counters after being possessed by Woo-Sik who granted her superhuman strength and psychometry. She is capable of sensing evil spirits even from hundreds of kilometers away, as well as being able to read and enter memories from years ago as if she was physically there. 
 Yeom Hye-ran as Choo Mae-ok
 The chef at Eonni's Noodles. In the past, she ran a photography studio for a living. Now a grieving mother dealing with the death of her son Su-ho. She joins the Counters after being possessed by Su-ho's spirit. She gains powerful healing abilities. Exuding an extremely caring and positive personality that highly contrasts with Mo-tak and Ha-na, she serves as the team's advisor and a mother figure to Mun.

Supporting

Yung
 Moon Sook as Wi-gen
 Mun's first Yung partner. Wi-gen is the leader of the Yung, the boundary between the afterlife and the world of the living. She is amazed by the fact that she was able to possess Mun despite the latter not being comatose.
 Kim So-ra as Kim Gi-ran
 Mo-tak's Yung partner. Gi-ran is an upright spirit who is greatly angered by Mo-tak and his fellow Counters' occasional rule-breaking.
 Eun Ye-jun as Woo-sik
 Ha-na's Yung partner. Woo-sik appears to be a young boy but he is mature in his mindset and personality.
 Lee Chan-hyung as Kwon Su-ho
 Mae-ok's Yung partner and her biological son. Su-ho is in charge of keeping Yung's record of deaths.
 Woo Mi-hwa as The Prosecutor

Humans possessed by evil spirits
 Lee Hong-nae as Ji Chung-sin
 A human possessed by a Level 3 evil spirit (akgwi). Chung-sin works in a junkyard and is frequently hired as a hitman by Mayor Shin through his adoptive father. His biological father ran the care home he was adopted from, yet both of his father figures were extremely abusive towards Chung-sin during childhood and provided very little affection to him growing up, instead honing him into a criminal servant for their own dirty deeds. He killed the late counter Cheol-joong in a fierce battle. He possesses an advanced level of psychokinesis which can effortlessly incapacitate individuals.
 Ok Ja-yeon as Baek Hyang-hui
 A human possessed by a Level 3 evil spirit. Hyang-hee is inclined to marrying rich men in order to murder them and steal their money. She has the power of psychometry and is able to communicate with the possessing evil spirit, as well as demonstrating superhuman strength. Naturally flirtatious, her charm often catches her victims off-guard leading to an easier murder.

Mun's high school
 Kim Eun-soo as Kim Woong-min
 Mun's schoolmate and childhood best friend. Without Mun's knowing, Woong-min is constantly being bullied by Hyuk-woo and his henchmen. His suffering is later discovered by Mun, who then uses his newfound Counter powers to humiliate Hyuk-woo.
 Lee Ji-won as Im Ju-yeon
 Mun's schoolmate and childhood best friend. Joo-yeon kept the truth from Mun that Woong-min is being bullied by Hyuk-woo.
 Jung Won-chang as Shin Hyuk-woo
 Son of Jungjin Mayor Shin Myung-hwi; Mun's schoolmate. As the mayor's son, Hyuk-woo receives preferential treatment from the school faculty who let him get away with his bullying. His behavior however, stems from fearing his father and estranged relationship with him. 
 Kim Min-ho as Baek Jun-kyu
 Mun's older and bigger schoolmate and the leader of a gang of bullies who collects money from younger bullies except Hyuk-woo with whom he is nicer with. Jun-kyu also has a strong grudge against Mun after being publicly humiliated in a fight with him.

People of Jungjin
 Ahn Suk-hwan as Choi Jang-mul
 The first and the leader of the Counters in Korea; owner of Jangmul Retail. Jang-mul is one of the richest chaebol in South Korea. He manages the Counters' expenses and supports them in matters that need his influence. He retired from being a Counter, though his powers and responsibilities as a Counter remain.
 Yoon Joo-sang as Ha Seok-gu
 Mun's maternal grandfather.
 Lee Joo-sil as Jang Chun-ok
 Mun's maternal grandmother. Chun-ok suffers from dementia and does not recognize Mun most of the time.
 Choi Yoon-young as Kim Jeong-yeong
 A police detective at Jungjin Police Station; Mo-tak's former fiancé. Jeong-yeong is an upright detective who is always overpowered by her corrupt fellow police officers. She was in charge of the case of the death of Mun's parents.
 Lee Kyung-min as Kang Han-wool
 A police detective at Jungjin Police Station; Jeong-yeong's junior and partner.
 Son Kang-gook as Choi Soo-ryong
 The police chief of Jungjin Police Station, easily influenced by Shin Myung-hwi for his own selfish interest.
 Choi Kwang-il as Shin Myung-hwi
 Mayor of Jungjin City; father of Hyuk-woo. Mayor Shin is in charge of a major redevelopment project in Jungjin which worries many residents.
 Jeon Jin-oh as Noh Chang-kyu
 A gangster who led the mob that cornered Mo-tak seven years ago; Hang-kyu's younger brother.
 Kim Seung-hoon as Noh Hang-kyu
 Director of Taeshin Group; Chang-kyu's older brother. A criminal who used Cho Tae-shin and Shin Myung-hwi's influence to fly through the ranks of Taeshin Group.
 Lee Do-yeop as Cho Tae-shin
 CEO of Taeshin Group, the company in charge of Jungjin's major redevelopment project that acts as a façade for a sinister motive.
 Kim Jung-jin as Jang Hye-kyung
 Secretary of Mayor Shin. Extremely obedient and hard-working, although not by choice.
 Kim Yi-kyung as Kim Yeong-nim
 A young woman who went missing after volunteering in Shin Myung-hwi's electoral camp seven years ago. She was close friends with Jang Hye-kyung.

Special appearances
 Jeon Seok-ho as So Gwon
 Mun's father and a police officer who was an acquaintance of Mo-tak, who investigated Mayor Shin's corruption together. ( 1-2, 11, 15-16).
 Son Yeo-eun as Ha Mun-young
 Mun's mother and a police officer. Despite the two of them being constantly busy with their line of work and having no time to bond with Mun, they deeply care and love him. (Eps. 1-2, 16).
 Sung Ji-ru as Jang Cheol-joong
 A late member of the Counters. Cheol-joong was the strongest Counter among the former quartet. He was killed by Chung-sin in a fierce one-on-one battle ( 1, 16).
 Lee Sun-bin as Heo Hee-young
 A coffee shop owner whose parents were killed by a Level 2 evil spirit (Eps. 1, 3)
 Lee Jin-kwon as Subordinate
 A Dajeong ENC employee. (Ep. 12)
 Choi Go as an orphan
 An orphan at the same care home Chung-sin grew up in, quickly seeing him as a father figure due to the lack thereof prior. (Ep. 13-14)
 Son Ho-jun as Oh Jung-gu
 A South Korean Counter who was delegated to work in Singapore. A former rock musician, he became a Counter when his Yung partner Dong-pal possessed him when he was comatose; he had healing powers, similar to Mae-ok. He was dispatched back to South Korea in order to heal a severely wounded Mae-ok, and later joined them on a mission against a Level 4 spirit. (Ep. 15)
 Im Ji-kyu as Dong-pal
 Mun's second Yung partner; the former Yung partner of Jang-mul and Jung-gu. Dong-pal became Jung-gu's partner after Jang-mul's retirement. (Ep. 15)

Episodes

Production

Development
Scriptwriter Yeo Ji-na left the series after 12 episodes due to "different opinions on the series' final storyline;" the 13th episode was written by director Yoo Seon-dong and the final three episodes of the season were written by Kim Sae-bom. On January 25, 2021, the series was officially renewed for a second season.<ref>{{Cite web|url=http://www.osen.co.kr/article/G1111511776|title=경소문' 측 "시즌2 제작 확정..출연진·편성·촬영시기 정해진 바 없다"[공식]|trans-title='The Uncanny Counter' "Season 2 production confirmed.. cast, broadcasting and filming dates are not confirmed" [Official]|last=Park|first=Pan-seok|date=October 19, 2020|website=OSEN}}</ref>

Through OCN and tvN, a special broadcast titled The Uncanny Return (경이로운 귀환) is scheduled to air on February 7, 2021 at 22:40 (KST). The special broadcast stars Jo Byung-gyu, Yoo Jun-sang, Kim Se-jeong, Yeom Hye-ran, Ahn Suk-hwan, Choi Kwang-il, Ok Ja-yeon, Lee Hong-nae and Jung Won-chang.

Casting
In July 2020, Jo Byung-gyu, Yoo Jun-sang, Kim Se-jeong and Yeom Hye-ran were confirmed to star in the series. The first script reading took place in October 2020.

Music
The following is the official track list of The Uncanny Counter: Original Soundtrack'' album, which was released by labels Genie Music and Stone Music Entertainment on January 24, 2021. The tracks with no indicated lyricists and composers are the drama's musical score; the artists indicated for these tracks are the tracks' composers themselves.

Part 1

Part 2

Part 3

Release
The first teaser was released on October 19, 2020, giving sneak peeks of the characters.

Viewership
The first episode of the series logged an average viewership ratings of 2.7% nationwide and 3.2% in metropolitan area, peaking to a high of 4.1%. The second episode  logged ratings of 4.35%, witnessing an unusual increase in average nationwide viewership compared to the ratings of the first episode. The audience rating for the 3rd episode was 5.2% nationwide. It rose 0.8% points from the ratings of last two episodes. The 16th episode recorded a rating of 11% for nationwide audience, which was the highest for the series.

Awards and nominations

Notes

References

External links
  
 
 
 
 The Uncanny Counter at Naver 
 The Uncanny Counter at Daum 

OCN television dramas
2020 South Korean television series debuts
South Korean mystery television series
South Korean fantasy television series
Television shows based on South Korean webtoons
Television productions suspended due to the COVID-19 pandemic
Korean-language Netflix exclusive international distribution programming